Carbondale is a city in Jackson County, Illinois, United States, within the Southern Illinois region informally known as "Little Egypt". The city developed from 1853 because of the stimulation of railroad construction into the area. Today the major roadways of Illinois Route 13 and U.S. Route 51 intersect in the city. Carbondale is the home of the main campus of Southern Illinois University (SIU).

As of the 2020 census, the city had a population of 25,083, making it the most populous city in Southern Illinois outside the St. Louis Metro-East region.

History
In August 1853, Daniel Harmon Brush, John Asgill Conner, and Dr. William Richart bought a  parcel of land between two proposed railroad station sites (Makanda and De Soto) and two county seats (Murphysboro and Marion). Brush named Carbondale for the large deposit of coal in the area. The first train through Carbondale arrived on Independence Day 1854, traveling north on the main line from Cairo, Illinois.

By the time of the American Civil War, Carbondale had developed as a regional center for transportation and business, surrounded by agricultural development. This part of Illinois was known as "Little Egypt" because of the confluence of the Ohio and Mississippi rivers, where the town of Cairo is located.

The city has had a college since 1856 beginning with the Presbyterian-founded Carbondale College which was later converted to an elementary school. Carbondale also won the bid for the new state teacher training school for the region, and Southern Illinois Normal University opened in 1874. This gave the town new industry, new citizens, and a supplement to public schools. In 1947, the name was changed to Southern Illinois University (SIU). It has become the flagship of the Southern Illinois University system. This institution, now recognized as a national research university, has nearly 18,000 students enrolled (as of 2014) and offers a wide variety of undergraduate and graduate specialties.

On April 29, 1866, one of the first formal Memorial Day observations following the Civil War was held at the city's Woodlawn Cemetery. Local resident, General John A. Logan, gave the principal address. Logan, as co-founder of the Civil War veteran's group the "Grand Army of the Republic", issued General Order #11 on March 3, 1868, calling for a national day of remembrance for Civil War dead. This order served as the basis for the creation of a formal Memorial Day. Logan called observance day "Decoration Day" and proposed it for May 30, to assure flowers would be in bloom nationwide.

In the early 20th century, Carbondale was known as the "Athens of Egypt," due to the expansion of the college and university, and the region's moniker of "Little Egypt." The phrase dates to at least 1903, when it appeared in a local paper. By 1922, the Carbondale Free Press was using the phrase on its flag.

On November 12, 1970, a largescale shootout occurred between local police and members of the local chapter of the Black Panther Party who were meeting at a house in town. The event was later chronicled in the documentary 778 Bullets, made by a professor at SIU.

Eclipse Crossroads of America
The area was in totality during the solar eclipse of August 21, 2017, with Giant City State Park, just south of the city, experiencing the longest period of totality during the eclipse (approximately 2 minutes and 40 seconds), earning it the nickname, "Eclipse Crossroads of America". It will also be within the path of totality of the solar eclipse of April 8, 2024, making it one of only a handful of cities within the direct paths of both eclipses.

Geography
Carbondale is located at  (37.726, −89.220). Carbondale has been in totality path of one previous solar eclipse on August 21, 2017 and hosted the longest duration of totality with 2 minutes 41.6 seconds just to its south in Makanda Township, and additionally will be in the path of another April 8, 2024.

Climate
Carbondale lies in the northern limits of a humid subtropical climate (Köppen Cfa), with four distinct seasons. On average, there are 38 days of + highs, 16 days where the high fails to rise above freezing, and 1.6 nights of sub- per year.

Carbondale receives thunderstorms on an average of 50 days per year. Particularly in the spring, these storms can often be severe, with high winds, damaging hail, and tornadoes.

Demographics

As of the census of 2000, there were 25,597 people, 10,018 households, and 3,493 families residing in the city. The racial makeup of the city was 66.08% White, 23.14% Black or African American, 0.22% Native American, 6.67% Asian, 0.08% Pacific Islander, 1.42% from other races, and 2.40% from two or more races. Hispanic or Latino of any race were 3.05% of the population.

There were 9,981 households, out of which 17.0% had children under the age of 18 living with them, 22.1% were married couples living together, 10.1% had a female householder with no husband present, and 21.5% were non-families. 43.5% of all households were made up of individuals, and 6.9% had someone living alone who was 65 years of age or older. The average household size was 2.33 and the average family size was 2.78.

In the city, the population was spread out, with 15.8% under the age of 18, 35.4% from 18 to 24, 27.1% from 25 to 44, 12.5% from 45 to 64, and 9.3% who were 65 years of age or older. The median age was 25 years. For every 100 females, there were 106.2 males. For every 100 females age 18 and over, there were 105.6 males.

The median income for a household in the city was $27,882, and the median income for a family was $34,601. Males had a median income of $30,217 versus $24,114 for females. The per capita income for the city was $13,346. About 13.5% of families and 21.4% of the population were below the poverty line, including 32.1% of those under the age of 18 and 13.2% of those 65 and older. However, traditional measures of income and poverty can be misleading when applied to cities with high student populations, such as Carbondale.

Government

The city of Carbondale has a council-manager government. There are a total of seven elected city officials: a mayor and six city council members elected at-large for four-year staggered terms. The City Manager, a professional hired by the city council, appoints the department heads. The city provides services such as police, fire, development services, public works, and public library. Several boards and commissions allow for citizen participation, bringing more citizens into civic activities and helping to bridge the gap between the residents and the government. Carbondale is a zoned, home rule municipality. In 2010, the city approved a new comprehensive plan that lays out goals for the future and ways to accomplish these goals.
On April 5, 2011, Joel Fritzler was elected mayor for a four-year term, but on February 3, 2014, he resigned to accept a job in Arizona. The City Council chose Don Monty as acting mayor to finish Fritzler's term. On April 7, 2015, John "Mike" Henry was elected mayor, and he took office in May 2015.

Culture
In addition to Southern Illinois University, which presents regular concerts and theatrical productions, as well as art and history exhibits, the city has a variety of unique cultural institutions. PBS and NPR broadcasting stations (WSIU) are affiliated with the university. Carbondale also is home to WDBX Community Radio for Southern Illinois, and the Big Muddy Independent Media Center.

The area is served by a regional daily newspaper, The Southern Illinoisan and the university's Daily Egyptian, as well as two weeklies, the Carbondale Times and the Nightlife.

SIU has a teaching museum on campus, the University Museum, which has 60,000 artifacts in its collection and hosts traveling shows from known artists. In addition to the University Museum, there is the African American Museum and The Science Center. Theater-goers can see both professional and student-produced plays and performances at the university's McLeod and Kleinau Theaters. SIUC is also home to the largest auditorium in Southern Illinois, Shryock Auditorium. Shryock Auditorium has brought in many performing artists, such as B.B. King, the Supremes, Ray Charles, and Judy Collins, along with orchestras and other musical productions. Carbondale is also home to Lost Cross, the longest running DIY punk venue in the country, which has hosted local and national acts like Black Flag.

Theater-goers can also attend off-campus productions by The Jackson County Stage Company (Stage Company). In 2007, the Stage Company and Carbondale Community Arts (CCA) partnered to purchase and renovate the Varsity Theater, which had been vacant since 2003, into the Varsity Center for the Arts (VCA). The VCA is now the performing home of the Stage Company and also supports a variety of other fine arts and performances through the CCA.

Civic action is encouraged by groups such as Carbondale Conversations for Community Action (the local implementation of Study Circles). There are several lodges and clubs, such as the Fraternal Order of Eagles, Elks, Rotary International, and the A.F.A.M (Freemasonry).

The Women's Center, in continuous service since its founding in 1972, was one of the first domestic violence shelters in the United States.

Spirituality finds expression in Carbondale in churches of a variety of Christian denominations, a Unitarian Universalist fellowship, two mosques, a Jewish congregation, a Sufi community, and two Buddhist organizations – the Shawnee Dharma Group and the Sunyata Center. The first Hindu temple in Southern Illinois held its grand opening in Carbondale in June 2013. The Gaia House Interfaith Center provides space for intercultural exchange and personal growth. It is also an education center to help the community become more ecologically conscious, understand how to incorporate better practices into daily life, and set goals for the future.

Notable poets that reside in or near Carbondale include Rodney Jones, Judy Jordan, Allison Joseph, and the Transpoetic Playground collective.

Retail
The city's business districts include several large shopping malls (including University Mall on the east side of town), featuring a mixture of national chain stores and locally owned businesses. In addition, Carbondale is home to many small shops and restaurants, many of them located in the downtown area. The downtown district is supported by Carbondale Main Street, which has listings and information about individual businesses. Because of the large student population in the city, there is a great variety of restaurants, featuring many nationalities of cuisine. Several bars and coffeehouses offer live music, poetry readings, and other entertainment. The Carbondale Chamber of Commerce offers information on local businesses in over 60 categories.

Celebrations
Carbondale is known for a number of yearly festivals, including the Lights Fantastic parade in December, the Big Muddy Film Festival (February/March), the Southern Illinois Irish Festival (April), the Indian (Hindu, Sikh and Jain) celebration of Diwali (October/November), the Great Cardboard Boat Regatta (April), the Sunset Concerts (a summer series of free outdoor concerts on the Southern Illinois University campus and in city parks), and Brown Bag Concerts (a spring and fall series of free outdoor concerts in the Town Square Pavilion).

Recreation
Carbondale has 18 public tennis courts, as well as the Superblock, which is a sports multi-complex with baseball, softball, soccer, football, and track fields. The Carbondale Park District maintains seven parks and an indoor pool for public use. In 2010 the park district opened a new spray park in Crispus Attucks Park, and a water park opened in May 2016 at the Superblock. Southern Illinois University's Recreation Center is open to the public; it provides swimming, bowling, rock climbing walls, tennis, basketball, an indoor track, racquetball, weight training, and a variety of exercise equipment.

Carbondale is located near many venues for outdoor activities, including some 14 parks in the immediate vicinity. These include the Crab Orchard National Wildlife Refuge, the Shawnee National Forest, Giant City State Park, Little Grand Canyon, Piney Creek Ravine, Pomona Natural Bridge, the Garden of the Gods Wilderness area, and Trail of Tears State Park. These areas offer opportunities for hiking, boating, biking, and horseback riding.

Five minutes south of Carbondale is the city reservoir, Cedar Lake, which is open to kayaking and canoeing. The north access features several dramatic rock bluffs and secluded bays. Other lakes nearby include Little Grassy Lake, Devils Kitchen Lake, Crab Orchard Lake, and Kinkaid Lake. Another more remote location is Cache River Swamp, the northernmost cypress swamp in North America. The surrounding areas also offer hiking and mountain biking.

Also a few minutes south of Carbondale is Jeremy Rochman Memorial Park, established by Barrett Rochman in memory of his son Jeremy "Boo" Rochman, who died in an auto accident at age 19. It features a castle with life-sized figures on a Dungeons & Dragons theme.

The Shawnee National Forest, close to Carbondale, is home to many wineries. The Shawnee Hills Wine Trail visits twelve vineyards in scenic settings, offering local wines and dining facilities. Several of the vineyards are bed-and-breakfasts or offer cabins for close accommodations.

The presence of Southern Illinois University also means that Carbondale area residents can attend Division I events of SIU's "Salukis" sport teams. The mascot term "Salukis" is a reference to a dog breed from ancient Egypt, a nod to the fact that the Southern Illinois region is frequently referred to by the nickname "Little Egypt."

Activism
Due to the presence of Southern Illinois University, Carbondale residents have a tradition of political activism. During the Vietnam War, and especially after the Kent State shootings, massive anti-war demonstrations took place on the SIU campus and on the streets of Carbondale. They resulted in the closure of SIU, more than $100,000 of property damage, more than 400 arrests, and the deployment of the National Guard to restore order.

In 2011, the Occupy Movement took up residence on the lawn of Quigley Hall at Southern Illinois University, occasionally clashing with local police and with university policy.

SIU's Faculty Association went to the picket lines on November 3, 2011, after an agreement could not be reached between the Association and the administration concerning contracts. The other unions—the Non-Tenure Track Faculty Association, the Association of Civil Service Employees, and Graduate Assistants United—all settled with the administration within hours of the picketing action. The Faculty Association came to an agreement with the administration on November 10. The strike was the first ever in the school's history.

Several local organizations are concerned with peace, justice and the environment, including the Peace Coalition of Southern Illinois/Fellowship of Reconciliation, the Shawnee Green Party, the Student Environmental Center, the Southern Illinois Center for a Sustainable Future, and local chapters of the American Civil Liberties Union, the Sierra Club, and the National Audubon Society.

In 2001, the city was the location for the national Green Party Congress.

Reveling
An area near campus known as "The Strip" was also the site of several infamous riots on Halloween in the 1980s and 1990s. The last Halloween riot occurred in 2000, when students clashed with and were tear gassed by police. Property and trees in the area of The Strip were destroyed. After the 2000 riot, measures were taken to prevent violence on Halloween weekend. The campus and the bars along Southern Illinois Avenue were closed on Halloween in following years.

As of 2018 Halloween celebrations have resumed with no notable instances of unrest.

Transportation

Highways
The city of Carbondale sits on the intersection of U.S. Route 51 and Illinois Route 13. Interstate 57 is accessible to the east on Route 13 at Marion, and to the south on Rt. 51 near Dongola. Interstate 64 is accessible to the north on Rt. 51. Interstate 24 is accessible six miles south of Marion on I-57. The city is 331 highway miles from Chicago, 96 highway miles from St. Louis, and 213 highway miles from Memphis. (A historical note: When Illinois first developed the state highway system in the 1920s, what is now Rt. 51 was Illinois Route 2, which ran the length of the state).

Air service
The Southern Illinois Airport is located northwest of the city and offers private aviation services and is home to SIU's aviation program. On April 2, 2010, state and university officials broke ground on a Transportation Education Center on the airport grounds.

Rail service

Amtrak Train 59, the southbound City of New Orleans, departs Carbondale daily with service to Memphis, Jackson, and New Orleans (and intermediate stations). Amtrak Train 58, the northbound City of New Orleans, departs Carbondale daily with service to Centralia, Effingham, Mattoon, Champaign-Urbana, Kankakee, Homewood, and Chicago.

Carbondale is also served by Amtrak Train 390/391, the Saluki, daily in the morning, and Amtrak Train 392/393, the Illini, daily in the afternoon/evening. Both the Saluki and the Illini operate to Chicago, originating and terminating in Carbondale.

Amtrak uses the tracks of the Canadian National Railway, which provides freight service to the city's industrial park. The railroad runs along the original line of the Illinois Central Railroad that began service in 1854 in Carbondale.

Public transit
The Saluki Express provides bus service around the city. SIUC students, faculty, and staff, as well as the greater Carbondale community, are encouraged to use the service. This system offers eleven routes operating seven days a week while the university is in session, and a "break route" operating during semester breaks.

Local public transit is also provided by Jackson County Mass Transit District six days a week and RidesMTD provides bi-hourly service between Carbondale and Marion six days a week.

Private transit
Carbondale also has a licensed taxi company, Jet Taxi and SI Taxi.

Greyhound offers inter-city bus service from the BP Gas Station at 905 E. Main St., Illinois.

Notable people

Awards

Winner, "All America City", 1971
Selected as "Tree City USA", since 1981
Selected as one of "The Best Towns in America," 1983
Winner, "GFOA Distinguished Budget Presentation Award", since 1986
Selected as "Best Small City in Illinois", 1990, 1997
Winner, "Governor's Hometown Award", 1991, 1992, 2005, 2009
Selected as one of the "101 Best Outdoor Towns in America," 2007
Honorable Mention, "City Livability Award," 2009
Finalist, "All America City Award," 2009
Finalist, "Award for Municipal Excellence", 2009

Sister cities
Tainai, Niigata, Japan (former town of Nakajo and the city of Carbondale became sister cities in the past)
Tainan City, Taiwan
Shimla, Himachal Pradesh, India

See also
 Carbondale Community High School – high school located in Carbondale, Illinois.

References

External links

Official city website

Further reading
 Brush, Daniel. 1992. Growing Up With Southern Illinois. Herrin, Ill.: Crossfire Press. 380 pages. 
 Erwin, Milo, and Jon Musgrave. 2006. The Bloody Vendetta of Southern Illinois. Marion, Ill.: IllinoisHistory.com. 240 pages.
 Wright, John W. D. 1977. A History of Early Carbondale, Illinois, 1852–1905. Carbondale, Ill.: Southern Illinois University Press. 384 pages. .

 
Cities in Illinois
Cities in Jackson County, Illinois
Metropolitan areas of Illinois
Populated places established in 1856
1856 establishments in Illinois